Ayasrah, is the name of a prominent Jordanian family based in Sakib. They trace their lineage back to Banu Hashim, as Hashemite descendants of the prophet Muhammad.

Etymology 
In the early 16th century, there were two contiguous villages named Sakib and Aysra (عيصره). The family took the name from Aysra, which is now the northern part of present-day Sakib. In 1538, the Ottoman census of the liwa (district) of Ajlun indicates that Sakib had a population of 13 households and 1 mosque's imam, while Aysra had a population of 7 households and 1 mosque's imam.

Family tree

Wahdan Bek is the ancestor of the Ayasrah family, and he is the 31st-generation direct descendant of the prophet Muhammad.

Notes

References

 
 

Hashemite people
Jordanian families
Jordanian Muslims